Portal A is a digital content company that creates branded and original entertainment. Portal A was founded by three childhood friends, Nate Houghteling, Kai Hasson, and Zach Blume. Portal A is independently owned with offices in SoMa and Downtown Los Angeles.

In 2019, Portal A entered into a strategic partnership with Brent Montgomery and Jimmy Kimmel's Wheelhouse Entertainment, with Wheelhouse taking a minority stake in the company.

Original Content 

Portal A's originals division is represented by WME. The studio created White Collar Brawler, an original digital series that ran for multiple seasons on TV with the Esquire Network.

Portal A released Song Voyage, a comedy series shot in Asia following YouTube musical group The Gregory Brothers. The show was distributed by Disney's Maker Studios, and earned over 30 million views, including the viral “Chicken Attack” music video.

The studio released One Shot on Youtube Red in February 2018, an unscripted special with WilldaBeast Adams on a journey to find the next underground dance star.

Portal A developed and produced 5 Minutes From Home, a series starring Stephen Curry. The series received 6 million views over its first three episodes. Lyft sponsored the second season of 5 Minutes From Home.

In 2018, Portal A announced State of Pride for YouTube Originals, a documentary feature film directed by Rob Epstein and Jeffrey Friedman. The film premiered at the opening night of South by Southwest and was named Best Documentary at the GLAAD Awards.

In 2020, Portal A announced the scripted original series Action Royale with Snap, and released the 60-minute special Ultimate Home Championship with YouTube Originals.

Branded Content 

Portal A works with YouTube and Google on social video campaigns, and with Lenovo, Target, Infiniti, Clorox, Amazon, Twitter, Sony Pictures, Procter & Gamble, Warner Bros., Universal Pictures, and others.

Portal A is known for producing the annual YouTube Rewind, which has accrued over 1 billion views in aggregate since 2011. The company also produced YouTube Rewind 2018, noted as the most disliked video on YouTube.

The company has worked with Clorox for multiple projects, including "Best Roommate Ever" with Stephen Curry and King Bach. Portal A's work on the "#MotoMods + YouTube Heroes" campaign for Lenovo won a 2017 One Show Pencil. In 2018, Portal A won the Streamy Award for Best Branded Content and the Streamy Award for Best Influencer Campaign for its work with Clorox. In 2020, Portal A released Let's Target with Target featuring Laverne Cox, Tabitha Brown, Emma Chamberlain and others.

Portal A has worked on a variety of political initiatives, and partnered with the Hillary Clinton 2016 campaign to reach young voters in swing states.[11] In 2020, Portal A worked with the Joe Biden presidential campaign for a social media initiative called #ImVotingFor and released the documentary film American Pathogen, about the Trump administration's response to the COVID-19 pandemic.

Recognition 

In 2021, Portal A was named Agency of the Year by the Streamy Awards.

Portal A was named Content Agency of the Year by Digiday and named Video Agency of the Year by Digiday. Portal A was named Digital Studio of the Year by Cynopsis,  a top Content Agency by The Drum  and a finalist for Agency of the Year in the Streamy Awards in 2020.

Portal A was profiled by Adweek in its Portrait series and Business Insider wrote that Portal A is “a go-to for social video work for marketers anchored by influencers.”

References

Video hosting
Viral marketing
Technology companies of the United States